Harrison Michael Allan (born 7 May 1997) is a New Zealand rugby union player who plays for the  in the Super Rugby competition.  His position of choice is prop.

References 

New Zealand rugby union players
1997 births
Living people
Rugby union props
Canterbury rugby union players
Crusaders (rugby union) players
Manawatu rugby union players
Rugby union players from Christchurch